Notre Dame Junior Senior High School (NDJSHS) is a co-ed Catholic high school in Utica, New York. It is part of the Roman Catholic Diocese of Syracuse.

Notre Dame was established in 1959 by the Xaverian Brothers.  The land that the school was built on was the former location of a military hospital.  Initially, the school owned the land currently occupied by the Utica Business Park, but sold most of it to the city, creating its current boundaries. Originally just a high school, in 1994 both local Catholic junior high schools merged with Notre Dame and moved to the high school building.
 
The school hosts a Navy Junior Reserve Officers Training Corps.

Notable alumni
 Kim Bass, film and television writer, director, and producer; co-creator of Sister, Sister
 Anthony Brindisi, lawyer and politician; U.S. representative from New York from 2019 to 2021
 Mark Lemke, former MLB player for the Atlanta Braves and 1995 World Series champion
 Shelly Pennefather, former professional basketball player for the Nippon Express in Japan
 Jim Wessinger, former MLB player for the Atlanta Braves
 John Zogby, opinion pollster, author, and public speaker; founder of Zogby International poll

References

Catholic secondary schools in New York (state)
Roman Catholic Diocese of Syracuse
Buildings and structures in Utica, New York
Educational institutions established in 1959
Schools in Oneida County, New York
Private middle schools in New York (state)
1959 establishments in New York (state)